Boondandilla is a rural locality in the Goondiwindi Region, Queensland, Australia. In the  Boondandilla had a population of 0 people.

History 
The locality was officially named and bounded on 26 November 1999.

In the  Boondandilla had a population of 0 people.

References 

Goondiwindi Region
Localities in Queensland